Walter Huber (born 12 October 1957) is a Venezuelan judoka. He competed in the men's middleweight event at the 1976 Summer Olympics.

References

1957 births
Living people
Venezuelan male judoka
Olympic judoka of Venezuela
Judoka at the 1976 Summer Olympics
Place of birth missing (living people)